Chemically Imbalanced may refer to:
 Chemical imbalance
 Chemically Imbalanced (Ying Yang Twins album), 2006
 Chemically Imbalanced (Chris Webby album), 2014